Hibbertia circularis is a species of flowering plant in the family Dilleniaceae and is endemic to the northern part of the Northern Territory. It is a perennial herb with prostrate, trailing branches, elliptic to more or less round leaves, and yellow flowers arranged in leaf axils, with thirty stamens arranged in groups around the two carpels.

Description
There are thirty stamens and three or four staminodes arranged in groups around the two carpels, each carpel with two ovules. Flowering has been observed in February and March.

Taxonomy
Hibbertia circularis was first formally described in 2010 by Hellmut R. Toelken in the Journal of the Adelaide Botanic Gardens from specimens collected by Ian Cowie near Mount Howship in 2000. The specific epithet (circularis) refers to the almost round leaves.

Distribution and habitat
This hibbertia grows in sand between rocks in woodland in western Arnhem Land escarpment in the Northern Territory.

Conservation status
Goodenia circularis is only known from three collections and is classified as "data deficient" under the Northern Territory Government Territory Parks and Wildlife Conservation Act 1976.

See also
List of Hibbertia species

References

circularis
Flora of the Northern Territory
Plants described in 2010
Taxa named by Hellmut R. Toelken